Soldan may refer to:

 Soldan, ancient for Sultan
 Mariano Felipe Paz Soldán
 14190 Soldán
 Soldan International Studies High School
 Sandra Soldan
 Aho & Soldan
 Silvio Soldán
 Mackenzie Soldan
 Narciso Soldan
 Michael Soldan

See also 
 Soldano (disambiguation)